The Wisłoka is a river in south-eastern Poland, a tributary of the Vistula river, with a length of  and a basin area of .

Towns and townships around Wisłoka

Tributaries

Tributaries of the Wisłoka include:
 Jasiołka
 Tuszymka
 Wielopolka
 Ropa
 Grabinianka

See also
 1934 flood in Poland

References
Bibliography
 Fastnacht, Professor Adam.  – Slownik Historyczno-Geograficzny Ziemi Sanockiej w Sredniowieczu, Kraków 2002, 
Notes

See also
Rivers of Poland

Rivers of Poland
Rivers of Podkarpackie Voivodeship